Chessie System, Inc. was a holding company that owned the Chesapeake and Ohio Railway (C&O), the Baltimore and Ohio Railroad (B&O), the Western Maryland Railway (WM), and Baltimore and Ohio Chicago Terminal Railroad (B&OCT). Trains operated under the Chessie name from 1973 to 1987. 

Headquartered in Cleveland, Ohio, the Chessie System was the creation of Cyrus S. Eaton and his protégé Hays T. Watkins, then president and chief executive officer of the C&O. A chief source of revenue for the Chessie System was coal mined in West Virginia. Another was the transport of auto parts and finished motor vehicles.

The name "Chessie System" had been a popular nickname for the C&O since the 1930s, cemented with an advertising campaign that featured a sleeping kitten named Chessie. The 1970s holding company developed the "Ches-C" emblem: a kitten outline imposed on a circle, creating a rough letter C. This emblem was emblazoned on the front of all Chessie System locomotives, and also served as the "C" in "Chessie System" on the locomotive's flanks, and on other rolling stock.

History 
The three railroads that would make up the Chessie System had been closely related since the 1960s. C&O had acquired controlling interest in B&O in 1962, and the two had jointly controlled WM since 1967. 

Chessie System was incorporated in Virginia on February 26, 1973, and it acquired the railroads on June 15. 

On November 1, 1980, Chessie System merged with Seaboard Coast Line Industries to form CSX Corporation. Initially, the three Chessie System railroads continued to operate separately, even after Seaboard's six Family Lines System railroads were merged into the Seaboard System Railroad on December 29, 1982. That began to change in 1983, when the WM was merged into the B&O. The Chessie image continued to be applied to new and re-painted equipment until July 1, 1986, when CSXT introduced its own paint scheme. In April 1987, the B&O was merged into the C&O. In August 1987, C&O merged into CSX Transportation, a 1986 renaming of the Seaboard System Railroad, and the Chessie System name was retired.

List of railroad subsidiaries

Its subsidiaries included:

Baltimore & Ohio Railroad
Baltimore & Ohio Chicago Terminal Railroad
Chesapeake & Ohio Railway
Covington & Cincinnati Elevated Railroad & Transfer & Bridge Company
Staten Island Railroad
Toledo Ore RR Company
Western Maryland Railway

Notable locomotives 
The Chessie System company itself directly owned no locomotives or other rolling stock. Instead, equipment was placed on the roster of one of the three component railroads and ownership denoted by the reporting marks C&O, B&O, and WM. All three companies shared a common paint scheme of yellow, vermillion, and blue.

Notable Chessie System locomotives include:
B&O #1977 (EMD GP40-2) was meant to celebrate the B&O's 150th anniversary. For a short time, there were two B&O locomotives numbered 1977; this GP40 was later renumbered B&O 4100 and B&O 4163. 
B&O #GM50 (EMD GP40-2) was painted gold to celebrate GM-EMD's 50th anniversary as a diesel locomotive manufacturer. In 1984, it was repainted and renumbered B&O 4164.
B&O #3802 (EMD GP38) was named the All American Locomotive by Trains in 1982. It has been restored and is on display at the B&O Railroad Museum in Baltimore.
B&O #4444 (EMD GP40-2) pulled Ronald Reagan's 1984 presidential train through Ohio. It was the third-to-last GP40-2 owned by Chessie; the last was B&O 4447.

The former Reading Company #2101 (T-1-class 4-8-4) was one of three locomotives that pulled the American Freedom Train in 1975 and 1976. As part of B&O's 150th anniversary celebration in 1977, the Chessie System sent #2101 on a national tour as the "Chessie Steam Special". Painted in the Chessie System motif, the train consisted of the locomotive, two tenders, and 18 to 20 passenger and baggage cars. In March 1979, the locomotive was severely damaged in a fire while stored in a Chessie System roundhouse. It has since been cosmetically restored to its American Freedom Train paint scheme, and is on static display at the B&O Railroad Museum, although has been exposed to the elements for most of its time there.

In 2017, the Lake Shore Railway Historical Society acquired C&O 8272, a GE B30-7. It has been restored in the Chessie System paint scheme and currently resides at the Lake Shore Railway Museum in North East, Pennsylvania, and most recently, an EMD GP15T (C&O 1507) was donated to the B&O Railroad Museum.

Heritage units

In 2015, CSX used decals to decorate two of its locomotives in the livery of predecessor railroads. CSX AC4400CW 366 bears the "Chess-C" and C40-8W 7765 has the "B&O" logo. 366's decal was later damaged by fire and removed.

Further reading

External links

Chessie System Historical Society official site
Chessie Photo Archives
The 1977-1978 Chessie Steam Special for the railroad's 150th Anniversary

Chesapeake and Ohio Railway
Companies affiliated with the Baltimore and Ohio Railroad
Companies based in Cleveland
Predecessors of CSX Transportation
Railway companies established in 1973
Railway companies disestablished in 1986
United States railroad holding companies
Western Maryland Railway